Tidbury Ring is the site of an Iron Age univallate hillfort located in Hampshire. The earthworks have been heavily destroyed by ploughing, but some sections to the south remain in better condition. The entrance lies to the southeast of the fort. The interior is for the most part farmland with the earthworks now covered by small trees and undergrowth  Two Roman buildings, possibly a courtyard villa complex were found within the hill-fort. The site is now listed as a scheduled ancient monument no.87

Excavations
In the autumn of 1927 The Rev, Canon A.B. Milner, M.A. and a schoolboy, Donald Falconer of Mitcheldever did some digging on the site. Among the “usual debris” of a Roman British building they found two brass coins of the reign of Constantine the Great. One coin, in very good condition, cast in London prior to 311 A.D.

Location
The A34 dual-carriageway passes immediately to the east of the site. The hillfort of Norsebury Ring lies close by to the southeast. The hill has a summit of 114m AOD.

References

https://www.hantsfieldclub.org.uk/publications/hampshirestudies/digital/1940s/vol16/Milner.pdf

See also 
List of places in Hampshire
List of hill forts in England
List of hill forts in Scotland
List of hill forts in Wales



Iron Age sites in England
Buildings and structures in Hampshire
Hill forts in Hampshire
Archaeological sites in Hampshire